Svinalängorna (lit. The Swine Rows) is the debut novel by Swedish author Susanna Alakoski, published in 2006.

The novel has sold over 400,000 copies in Sweden. It won the August Prize in 2006. A film adaptation, Beyond, directed by Pernilla August, was released in 2010.

References

2006 Swedish novels
Swedish-language novels
August Prize-winning works
Swedish novels adapted into films
Novels set in Scania
Albert Bonniers Förlag books
2006 debut novels